The Borough of Dacorum is a local government district in Hertfordshire, England that includes the towns of Hemel Hempstead, Berkhamsted, Tring and Kings Langley. The district, which was formed in 1974, had a population of 137,799 in 2001. Its name was taken from the old hundred of Dacorum which covered approximately the same area. It is the westernmost of Hertfordshire's districts, being bordered to the west by the Chiltern and Aylesbury Vale districts of Buckinghamshire.

History
The name Dacorum comes from Latin and it means "of the Dacians" (with a "hundred" implied). The latter word was used mistakenly in the Middle Ages for 'Danes'. This happened because of a legend asserting that certain tribes from Dacia had migrated to Denmark.
The hundred of Dacorum was first recorded in 1196, although it has existed since the 9th and 10th centuries, when it lay near the southern boundary of the Danelaw, on the River Lea. In 1086, the Domesday Book records the hundreds of Tring and Danais in places that became parts of the hundred of Dacorum.

In 1974, the modern district of Dacorum was formed under the Local Government Act 1972. Major components were the municipal borough of Hemel Hempstead, the urban districts of Berkhamsted and Tring, the rural districts of Berkhamsted and Hemel Hempstead and those parts of the rural districts of St Albans and Watford which were within the designated area of Hemel Hempstead new town.

The district was granted borough status in 1984. Hemel Hempstead had maintained Charter Trustees from 1974 to 1984. The amalgamation of the former local authorities was symbolised in the seven oak leaves which surround a tudor rose on the Dacorum coat of arms.

Main settlements
The main towns and villages of the borough are:

Aldbury, Bovingdon, Berkhamsted, Bourne End, Bulbourne, Chipperfield, Cow Roast, Dudswell, Flamstead, Flaunden, Frithsden, Gaddesden Row, Great Gaddesden, Hemel Hempstead, Kings Langley, Little Gaddesden, Little Tring, Long Marston, Markyate, Nettleden, New Mill, Northchurch, Potten End, Ringshall, Tring, Tringford, Water End, Wigginton and Wilstone

The borough is entirely parished, apart from Hemel Hempstead.

Political representation

Dacorum Borough Council consists of 51 elected members, representing twenty-five electoral wards. 14 of the wards elect two councillors each. Six, indicated below, elect three councillors each. Five, also shown below, elect one each.

The council is currently controlled by the Conservatives, who hold 31 of the 51 seats. The Liberal Democrats hold 19, and 1 seat is held by an independent.

Composition

Wards
Dacorum consists of twenty-five wards. Wards electing three members are denoted with an asterisk (*). Those electing one member are denoted with an obelus (†).

Political control

Premises
From its creation, the council was based at Dacorum Civic Centre on Marlowes in Hemel Hempstead. This building had previously been called Hemel Hempstead Town Hall, having been built for Hemel Hempstead Borough Council in 1966 to replace the Old Town Hall on High Street. On 16 January 2017 the council opened its new headquarters at The Forum, on the corner of Marlowes and Combe Street, immediately south of the Civic Centre, which was demolished shortly afterwards.

Arms

Town twinning
The Borough of Dacorum is twinned with:
 Neu-Isenburg, Germany

Two of the civil parishes in the borough also maintain their own separate twinning arrangements:

Berkhamsted Town Council is twinned with:
 Beaune (France)
Kings Langley Parish Council with:
 Bakau (Gambia).

See also

Primary schools in Dacorum

References

Sources
The Dacorum Heritage Trust The Trust is the museum organisation for the Borough of Dacorum.
Hertfordshire Museums More local museums.

External links
Dacorum Borough Council - official website
 Dacorum Emergency Night Shelter - Night Shelter, Day Centre, Foodbank, Rent Aid,warehouse 

 
Districts of Hertfordshire
Boroughs in England